François Marie Sacco, C.R. or Francesco Maria Sacco (1643–1721) was a Roman Catholic prelate who served as Bishop of Brugnato (1697–1721) and Bishop of Ajaccio (1695–1697).

Biography
François Marie Sacco was born in 1643 in Savona, Italy and ordained a priest in the Congregation of Clerics Regular of the Divine Providence.
On 28 Nov 1695, he was appointed during the papacy of Pope Innocent XII as Bishop of Ajaccio.
On 30 Nov 1695, he was consecrated bishop by Pier Matteo Petrucci, Cardinal-Priest of San Marcello al Corso, with Francesco Gori, Bishop of Catanzaro, and Giovanni Battista Visconti Aicardi, Bishop of Novara, serving as co-consecrators.
On 27 Mar 1697, he was appointed during the papacy of Pope Innocent XII as Bishop of Brugnato.
He served as Bishop of Brugnato until his death on 21 Dec 1721.

Episcopal succession

References

External links and additional sources
 (for Chronology of Bishops) 
 (for Chronology of Bishops) 
 (for Chronology of Bishops) 
 (for Chronology of Bishops) 

17th-century Roman Catholic bishops in Genoa
18th-century Italian Roman Catholic bishops
Bishops appointed by Pope Innocent XII
1643 births
1721 deaths
People from Savona
Theatine bishops
Bishops of Ajaccio